The 2021 Russian regional elections took place in Russia on Sunday, 19 September 2021 with possibility of voting on 17 and 18 September provided by the electoral authorities. There will be the legislative election for the 8th State Duma, ten gubernatorial elections, 39 regional parliamentary elections, and many elections on the municipal and local level.

State Duma

All 450 seats of the State Duma were up for reelection on September 19.

Gubernatorial elections

Khabarovsk Krai

Ulyanovsk Oblast

Tula Oblast

Chechnya

Tver Oblast

Tuva

Regional legislative elections

Local self-government elections in regional capitals
Grozny, Kaliningrad, Kemerovo, Khanty-Mansiysk, Nalchik, Perm, Petrozavodsk, Saransk, Saratov, Stavropol, Ufa.

Notes

References

2021 elections in Russia
Regional elections in Russia